"Saving All My Love for You" is a song written by Michael Masser and Gerry Goffin, originally recorded by Marilyn McCoo and Billy Davis Jr. for their album Marilyn & Billy (1978). American singer Whitney Houston recorded a cover of the song for her self-titled debut studio album (1985). It was released on August 13, 1985, by Arista Records as the second single from the album in the United States and third worldwide.

Houston's version of "Saving All My Love for You"  garnered positive critical response, with reviewers praising its melodious production and her vocal performance, and picked it as one of the album's highlights. The song became a global success and represented a commercial breakthrough for Houston, topping the charts in four countries and reaching the top 10 in various other regions. It became her first song to top the US Billboard Hot 100, staying there for one week, and is certified Platinum by the RIAA for sales of over 1 million copies. At the 28th Annual Grammy Awards, it won for Best Female Pop Vocal Performance.

Background and release
"Saving All My Love for You" was written by Michael Masser and Gerry Goffin during the 1970s and originally recorded with Marilyn McCoo and Billy Davis Jr. on their LP "Marilyn and Billy" (1978). Years later, Masser saw Whitney for the first time when he went into New York City's Sweetwater club, an invitation made by Arista Records president Clive Davis, and she was singing one of his songs, "The Greatest Love of All". After her performance, the singer told Masser that the song was one of her favorites and later, Masser was chosen by Arista to produce some tracks for Houston's self-titled debut. After getting the right emotionally vulnerable-tailored take from Houston, the producer guaranteed her that it would become "a woman's song", meaning that women will feel a special affinity for the song.

After the success of her previous single, "You Give Good Love", the label initially didn't think about releasing "Saving All My Love for You" as the next single. When Masser heard that another single besides the song was being considered for the next single, he made a friendly wager with Davis during one of Houston's performance at the Roxy Theatre in Los Angeles. He proposed that if all the women get on their feet when Houston sings "Saving...", then Davis would agree that it should be the next single. Ultimately, the song was released as the second single in the United States and third single worldwide.

Composition and lyrics
"Saving All My Love for You" is a soul and R&B song, composed in the key of A major, having a slow tempo of 84 beats per minute. Houston's vocal range on the song extends from the low note of F#3 to the high note of F#5. The song features a saxophone solo by Tom Scott and its lyrics describe the thoughts of a young woman preparing for the arrival of her married lover, with lyrics like, "You've got your family, and they need you there/Though I've tried to resist, being last on your list/But no other man's gonna do/So I'm saving all my love for you." Dave Heaton of PopMatters wrote that Whitney sings some parts with bittersweet lightness ("that’s just an old fantasy") and other parts with urgent heaviness ("tonight is the night"), which he considers exactly right for carrying the feelings in the song.

The song caused controversy due to its theme of having an affair with a married man. Houston's mother Cissy Houston didn't at all like the scenario described in the lyric, claiming that the song's message would reflect badly on her daughter. However, Whitney herself confessed, "I was going through a terrible love affair. He was married, and that will never work out for anybody. Never, no way."

Reception

Critical response

"Saving All My Love for You" received critical acclaim. Stephen Thomas Erlewine of AllMusic picked the song as a highlight on the album, writing that the song "burns slowly and seductively." Dave Heaton of PopMatters praised Whitney for "singing as 'the other woman', ratcheting up the drama without overdoing it." Liam Lacey of The Globe and Mail wrote that 'Saving All My Love for You', 'Greatest Love Of All' and 'Hold Me' "are some of the loveliest pop singing on vinyl since the glory days of Dionne Warwick." Sputnikmusic called it "the sexiest, most romantic song on the record." Brad Wete of Vibe called it "goliath", writing that the song "was a fresh serving of precocious talent compared to 1985's mildly flavored R&B bluffet." Los Angeles Times praised her vocal performance, writing that, "it should mean a cinch Grammy nomination."

Chart performance
Released in 1985, Houston's version of "Saving All My Love for You" entered the Billboard Hot 100 at number 53, jumping to number 39 the following week (August 24), and reaching the Top 10 five weeks later. The single reached the number-one spot the week of October 26, 1985, and would become the first of seven record-setting consecutive number-one singles in the United States for Houston; a record that still holds. The single eventually spent fifteen weeks in the top forty. It also hit the top of the US Hot R&B/Hip-Hop Songs chart. It ranked number 5 on Billboard Year-end Top Black Singles chart.

The song also became a global hit, hitting number-one or the Top 10 in various countries around the world. In the United Kingdom, the song hit number-one on December 8, 1985, spending two weeks at the top. The single went on to become one of the top 25 best-selling singles of 1985 in the UK, and has since sold 740,000 copies. In 2012, Dan Lane of The Official Charts Company listed "Houston’s Top 20 Biggest Selling Tracks In The UK To Date" and "Saving All My Love for You" was placed at number 3, only losing to "I Will Always Love You" and "I Wanna Dance with Somebody".

In New Zealand, the song debuted at number 45, on November 3, 1985. It kept on climbing in the following two weeks, until it peaked at number 6, before dropping to number 8. However, on December 8, 1985, the song reached a new peak of number 5. The song was also a success in Switzerland, peaking at number 5, while in France, the song charted two times in different years. Firstly, the song charted when it was originally released in 1986, debuting at number 50 and peaking at number 11, while in 2012 (after Whitney's death), the song peaked at number 39.

Accolades
"Saving All My Love for You" earned Houston her first Grammy Award for Best Female Pop Vocal Performance in 1986; she also won the American Music Award for Favorite R&B/Soul Video for the song. It has subsequently entered lists of her best songs. While listing her "25 Best Songs", editors from Entertainment Weekly placed the song at number 21, writing that, "The stuff that's been piped into thousands of dentist offices, it was also her first No. 1 hit." BET placed the song at number 7 on their "40 Best Whitney Houston Songs", writing that, "The song has it all: her breathy come-ons, her trademark epic high notes, her delicate runs." Kelley L. Carter of MTV also listed the track on their "Whitney Houston's Top 10 Songs", complimenting the singer for taking an already-recorded song and giving it new life."

The New York Daily News ranked "Saving All My Love for You", at number 79 on its "The 100 Greatest Love Songs" list. The song was also ranked by The Telegraph amongst "The 50 Best Love Songs of the 1980s", with the authors writing that, "The song that launched Houston, invented a newly minted variety of globe-storming soul diva", picking the line, "Though I try to resist, being last on your list/But no other man's gonna do/So I'm saving all my love for you," as "killer".

Music video
The music video was directed by Stuart Orme and was filmed in London, where Houston was doing a promotional tour. The narrative for the music video follows the song's theme: Whitney's character is a recording artist who is emotionally involved with her married producer, played by American actor Ricco Ross. By the finale, he has returned to his wife and family, leaving her (the "other woman") romantically out in the cold.

At the time of release, the adultery theme of the video for generated much media controversy, which led Houston to insist, "I could never see myself in that position. I wouldn't just take whatever someone wants to give to me, especially if I am giving a lot to him but not getting that much back. I could never find myself in that situation, but someone else might. The video tells a story but it's by no means my story." It was also the first music video of Whitney's to be played on MTV after the channel had initially rejected her previous video for "You Give Good Love" for being "too R&B", but played the video for "Saving" because the song was too popular to ignore, stating, "I love it when they have no choice [but to play it]", in a 2001 MTV interview. Despite the controversy, the video won "Favorite Soul/R&B Video" at the American Music Awards of 1986. As of November , the video has garnered over 70M views and 325k likes on YouTube.

Live performances

Whitney performed "Saving All My Love for You" in a number of places. Whitney performed the track for the 28th Annual Grammy Awards and later took home the Best Female Pop Vocal Performance Award for the song. Her performance of the ballad at the GRAMMYs won her an Emmy for Outstanding Individual Performance in a Variety or Music Program. She also performed the song on Late Night with David Letterman in 1985. The performance was considered one of her best live performances by Digital Spy and VH1. While Liam O'Brien of Digital Spy wrote, "In this assured performance on Late Night With David Letterman, her vocal gymnastics left the host stunned," Mark Graham of VH1 simply picked it as her third best live performance.

She also included the track in all of her concert tours: The Greatest Love World Tour (1986), Moment of Truth World Tour (1987–1988), Feels So Right Tour (1990), I'm Your Baby Tonight World Tour (1991), The Bodyguard World Tour (1993–1994), Pacific Rim Tour (1997), The European Tour (1998), My Love Is Your Love World Tour (1999), Soul Divas Tour (2004) and on her final tour, Nothing but Love World Tour (2009–2010). "Saving All My Love for You" was also added to the setlist of her first ever solo televised concert and DVD/video release, Welcome Home Heroes with Whitney Houston (1991) and on her second DVD/video, Whitney: The Concert for a New South Africa (1994).

Track listings

US 7" Vinyl
A "Saving All My Love for You" – 3:46
B "All at Once" — 4:26
German 7" Vinyl
 "Saving All My Love for You" – 3:57
 "Nobody Loves Me Like You Do" (duet with Jermaine Jackson) – 3:46
UK 12" Vinyl
A "Saving All My Love for You"
B1 "All at Once"
B2 "Greatest Love of All"
German 7" Vinyl
A "Saving All My Love for You" – 3:57
B "How Will I Know" – 3:35

Personnel
Michael Masser, Gerry Goffin – writer
Whitney Houston – lead vocal
Dan Huff, Louis Shelton, Paul Jackson Jr. – guitar
Nathan East – bass guitar
Robbie Buchanan, Randy Kerber, Richard Marx – keyboards
Debbie Thomas, Oren Waters, Maxine Willard Waters, Julia Tillman Waters – background vocals
Tom Scott – saxophone solo
John Robinson – drums
Michael Masser – producer
Gene Page – arranger
Bill Schnee – mixer
Michael Mancini, Russell Schmitt – engineers

Charts and certifications

Weekly charts

Year-end charts

Certifications

See also
List of number-one singles of 1985 (Ireland)
List of UK Singles Chart number ones of the 1980s
List of Billboard Hot 100 number ones of 1985
List of Hot Adult Contemporary number ones of 1985
List of number-one R&B singles of 1985 (U.S.)

References

External links
Saving All My Love For You at Discogs
 
 

1985 singles
Whitney Houston songs
Marilyn McCoo songs
Billboard Hot 100 number-one singles
Irish Singles Chart number-one singles
UK Singles Chart number-one singles
Songs with lyrics by Gerry Goffin
Songs written by Michael Masser
Soul ballads
Contemporary R&B ballads
1978 songs
Arista Records singles
1970s ballads
Songs about infidelity
Grammy Award for Best Female Pop Vocal Performance
Music videos shot in London